is a 1946 Japanese film directed by Teinosuke Kinugasa.

Cast
Kazuo Hasegawa
Isuzu Yamada
Hideko Takamine
Chōko Iida
Mitsuko Yoshikawa
Ichiro Sugai
Tetsu Nakamura
Takashi Shimura
Eitarō Shindō
Susumu Fujita
Denjirō Ōkōchi

Awards
1st Mainichi Film Award
Won: Best Film

References

External links
 

1946 films
Films directed by Teinosuke Kinugasa
Japanese black-and-white films
Japanese drama films
1946 drama films
1940s Japanese-language films